The 1985 Stanley Cup Finals was the championship series of the National Hockey League's (NHL) 1984–85 season, and the culmination of the 1985 Stanley Cup playoffs. It was contested between the defending champion Edmonton Oilers (in their third straight Finals appearance) and the Philadelphia Flyers. The Oilers won the best-of-seven series, four games to one, to win their second Stanley Cup. It was also the sixth straight Finals contested between teams that joined the NHL in 1967 or later. Until , this was also the last time that a team, defending champion, or runner-up appeared in the Finals for the third straight season. Game five of this series was played on May 30, which at the time was the latest finishing date for an NHL season. The record was broken two years later.

Paths to the Finals

Edmonton defeated the Los Angeles Kings 3–0, the Winnipeg Jets 4–0, and the Chicago Black Hawks 4–2 to advance to the finals.

Philadelphia defeated the New York Rangers 3–0, the New York Islanders 4–1, and the Quebec Nordiques 4–2 to make it to the finals.

Game summaries
This was the first Stanley Cup Finals where games were scheduled for June. Had the series reached game six, it would have been played Sunday, June 2, with game seven on Tuesday, June 4. The NHL season would not extend into an actual June game until , due to a players strike.

This was the second and last Stanley Cup Finals to use the 2–3–2 format, long favored by Major League Baseball for its World Series and used from 1985 through 2013 for the NBA Finals. Since Edmonton went 6–0 at home during the 1984 and 1985 Finals, it was able to clinch in game five on home ice each time.

Grant Fuhr stopped two penalty shots.

This was the last Stanley Cup Finals in which either starting goalie wore the old-style fiberglass mask. Both Fuhr and the Flyers' Pelle Lindbergh wore the face-hugging mask, which was introduced in 1959 by Jacques Plante. The backups, Edmonton's Andy Moog and Philadelphia's Bob Froese, wore the helmet-and-cage combination, similar to the one Billy Smith wore in leading the New York Islanders to four consecutive Cups from 1980 to 1983.  The next year, the Calgary Flames' Mike Vernon sported a helmet-and-cage combo, and Montreal Canadiens rookie Patrick Roy wore a modern full fiberglass cage, the second goalie to sport that style in a Finals series after Gilles Meloche with the Minnesota North Stars in 1981. Fuhr switched to a full fiberglass cage the next season.

Game one

The Flyers posted a 4–1 victory to open the series. Edmonton coach Glen Sather was reportedly so disappointed with his team's performance that he burned the game videotapes after watching them.

Game two

Wayne Gretzky's first goal of the series late in the second period snapped a 1–1 tie, and Dave Hunter added an insurance empty-netter and the Oilers drew even in the series with a 3–1 win.

Game three

Gretzky almost single-handedly won Edmonton the game. He scored twice within the first 90 seconds of the game, and finished off a hat trick by the end of the first period. Although the Oilers put six shots on net over the final 40 minutes, it was enough to escape with a 4–3 win and 2–1 series lead.

Game four

Unbowed, the Flyers leapt out to a 3–1 lead midway through the first period thanks to goals at even strength, on the power play and shorthanded. However, the Oilers roared back with four consecutive goals, including two from Gretzky, to win 5–3 and take a commanding series lead.

Game five

Against backup goaltender Bob Froese, substituting for starter Pelle Lindbergh (who had been playing progressively less well over the course of the Finals), the Oilers blitzed the Flyers with a four-goal first period and sailed to a convincing 8–3 win. Gretzky and Kurri posted a goal and three assists each, while Paul Coffey and Mark Messier scored two goals apiece. Wayne Gretzky won the Conn Smythe Trophy as playoff MVP, scoring a record 47 points this playoff year.

Broadcasting
In Canada, this was the first of two consecutive years that the English-language rights of the Cup Finals was shared between CBC and CTV. CBC televised games one and two nationally while games 3–5 were televised in Edmonton only. CTV televised games 3–5 nationally while games were blacked out in Edmonton. Had the series gone to a Game 7, then both CBC and CTV would have simultaneously televised it while using their own production facilities and crews. Dan Kelly and Ron Reusch called the games on CTV.

In the United States, this was the fifth and final season that the Cup Finals aired nationally on the USA Network. Under the U.S. TV contracts that would take effect beginning next season, ESPN would take over as the NHL's American television partner. The USA Network would not air NHL games again until 2015, when it became an occasional overflow channel for NBC Sports' national coverage of the first two rounds of the Stanley Cup playoffs.

The USA Network's national coverage of the 1985 Cup Finals was blacked out in the Philadelphia area due to the local rights to Flyers games in that TV market. PRISM aired games one and two while WTXF aired games three, four, and five.

Team rosters

Edmonton Oilers

|}

Philadelphia Flyers

|}

Stanley Cup engraving
The 1985 Stanley Cup was presented to Oilers captain Wayne Gretzky by NHL President John Ziegler following the Oilers 8–3 win over the Flyers in game five.

The following Oilers players and staff had their names engraved on the Stanley Cup

1984–85 Edmonton Oilers

See also
 List of Stanley Cup champions
 1984–85 NHL season

References

 Podnieks, Andrew; Hockey Hall of Fame (2004). Lord Stanley's Cup. Bolton, Ont.: Fenn Pub. pp 12, 50. 

 
Stanley
Stanley Cup Finals
Edmonton Oilers games
Philadelphia Flyers games
May 1985 sports events in Canada
May 1985 sports events in the United States
Ice hockey competitions in Philadelphia
Ice hockey competitions in Edmonton
1980s in Edmonton
1980s in Philadelphia
1985 in Alberta
1985 in sports in Pennsylvania